Abul Kasame is a 1968 Khmer film adapted from one of the many tales of 1001 Arabian Nights. The film is directed by Yvon Hem and stars Kong Som Eun and Saom Vansodany. The film has recently been discovered to be in existence in 2008. Another film similar to this, and is also directed by Yvon Hem, is Ynav Bosseba.

Cast 
Kong Som Eun
Saom Vansodany
Pech Saleoun
Mandoline
Chin Sinath

Soundtrack 
"" by Sinn Si Samouth and Ros Serey Sothea
"Mon Teip Ney Chomreng" by Sinn Si Samouth and Ros Serey Sothea

References 

1968 films
Khmer-language films
Cambodian drama films
1960s rediscovered films